US Post Office—Olean is a historic post office building located at Olean in Cattaraugus County, New York. It was designed and built in 1910-12 and is one of a number of post offices in New York State designed by the Office of the Supervising Architect of the Treasury Department, James Knox Taylor. It is a two-story masonry and steel frame building.  Its Renaissance Revival design complements the adjacent Olean Public Library.

It was listed on the National Register of Historic Places in 1989.  It is located in the Union and State Streets Historic District.

References

External links
Historical marker/historic landmark for US Post Office--Olean in Olean, NY

Olean
Renaissance Revival architecture in New York (state)
Government buildings completed in 1912
Buildings and structures in Cattaraugus County, New York
1912 establishments in New York (state)
National Register of Historic Places in Cattaraugus County, New York
Historic district contributing properties in New York (state)